is a 1997 racing simulation video game developed by Polys Entertainment and published by Sony Computer Entertainment for the PlayStation video game console. Headed by Kazunori Yamauchi, the game's development group was later established as Polyphony Digital. It is the first game in the Gran Turismo series.

After five years of development time, it was well-received publicly and critically, shipping a total of 10.85 million copies worldwide (making it the best-selling PlayStation game), and scoring an average of 95% in GameRankings' aggregate, making it the highest rated racing video game at the time of the site's closure in 2019. Many publications have deemed it one of the greatest video games of all time. The game has started a series, and has spawned over 10 spin-offs and sequels.

Gameplay

Gran Turismo is a racing game. The player must maneuver a car to compete against artificially intelligent drivers on various race tracks. The game uses two different modes: Arcade Mode and Simulation Mode (Gran Turismo Mode in PAL and Japanese versions). In the arcade mode, the player can freely choose the courses and vehicles they wish to use. Winning races unlocks additional cars and courses.

However, simulation mode requires the player to earn different levels of driver's licenses in order to participate in events, and earn credits (money), trophies and prize cars by winning race championships.  Winning one particular championship also unlocks a video and a few additional demonstration tracks. Credits can be used to purchase additional vehicles, and for parts and tuning.

Gran Turismo features 140 cars and 11 race tracks (as well as their reversed versions). Two Honda NSX cars from 1992 were included in the Japanese version, but were removed from the North American and European versions. There is also a 1967 Chevrolet Corvette and a 1998 Mazda Roadster exclusive to the Arcade mode.

Development
The game took five years to complete. The development personnel were largely the same team which was behind the earlier PlayStation racers Motor Toon Grand Prix and Motor Toon Grand Prix 2, and Gran Turismo uses parts of the Motor Toon game engine, such as the physics model. Kazunori Yamauchi said that development of Gran Turismo started in the second half of 1992. Yamauchi added that at different times there were only seven to fifteen people assisting him. Since Motor Toon Grand Prix 2 was still in development when work on Gran Turismo started, several people only joined the development team after the completion of Motor Toon Grand Prix 2 freed them up to work on Gran Turismo.

When asked how difficult it was to create Gran Turismo, Yamauchi remarked: "It took five years. In those five years, we could not see the end. I would wake up at work, go to sleep at work. It was getting cold, so I knew it must be winter. I estimate I was home only four days a year". While the team used standard PlayStation libraries in part, to get the game to run at optimal speed they had to use assembly code, and even then, they found the limitations of the PlayStation's CPU would not allow them to meet their initial goal of having 12 cars in each race. Sound design was one aspect that Yamauchi believed was compromised due to a lack of time. Although Kazunori considered the game's artificial intelligence to be superior to its competitors, he remained unsatisfied with its development.

Gran Turismo was the first game designed to fully support the PlayStation's DualShock controller.

When Gran Turismo was released in Japan, Polyphony Digital was still a development group within Sony Computer Entertainment. The studio was established in April 1998, before the Western release of the game. Yamauchi estimated that Gran Turismo utilised around 75% of the PlayStation's maximum performance.

Reception

Commercial
Gran Turismo was a commercial hit. In May 1998, Sony awarded Gran Turismo a "Double Platinum Prize" for sales above 2 million units in Japan alone. In its first month on the Japanese market, it sold over 1 million copies, making it the best-selling video game of the 1997 holiday shopping season in Japan. According to Weekly Famitsu, it sold an additional 1.34 million units during the first half of 1998, which made it Japan's second-best selling game for that period. It was also a high-seller in Australia, selling over 100,000 units in the first two months and with sales exceeding 130,000 by October 1998. In the United States, it was the best-selling PlayStation game of 1998 with 1,431,483 sales and  revenue. It was again the best-selling PlayStation game of 1999 in the United States, where it sold  units and grossed an estimated  that year, adding up to  sales and about  revenue in the United States by 1999.

It received a "Gold" award from the Verband der Unterhaltungssoftware Deutschland (VUD) in August 1998, for sales of at least 100,000 units across Germany, Austria and Switzerland. It sold 270,000 units in the German market from January through September 1998, which made it the region's best-selling console game of the period across all systems. The VUD raised it to "Platinum" status, indicating 200,000 sales, by November. This made it Europe's second-highest-grossing game of the year, behind Tomb Raider III.

By March 1999, Gran Turismo had sold over six million units worldwide, of which two million were derived from the United States. By February 2000, it had sold  units worldwide, for which it was awarded the Guinness World Record for Best-Selling Driving Simulator. By December 2000, it had sold more than  copies worldwide, including  units in the United States. As of April 2008, the game has shipped 2.55 million copies in Japan, 10,000 in Southeast Asia, 4.3 million in Europe, and 3.99 million in North America, for a total of 10.85 million copies. It remains the best-selling video game for the PlayStation and the fourth highest-selling game in the Gran Turismo franchise, behind Gran Turismo 4, Gran Turismo 5 and Gran Turismo 3: A-Spec respectively.

In Australia, the game sold more than 110,000 copies in its first two months.

Critical
Gran Turismo received widespread acclaim from critics and consumers alike, with praise for its graphics, soundtrack, tight controls and number of cars. It was classified as "universal acclaim", according to review aggregator Metacritic.

Next Generation reviewed the PlayStation version of the game, rating it five stars out of five, and stated that "as it stands in the Japanese version, everything about Gran Turismo is a class act, and it raises the bar for racing games on almost every possible level. Our highest possible recommendation".

Gran Turismo won Best Simulation of 1999 at the Spotlight Awards, won "Best Driving Game" and "Best Graphics" of 1999 according to the staff of PlayStation Official Magazine, and was voted the sixth best game of all time by the magazine's readers in the same issue. In 2000, readers of Computer and Video Games voted it the eighth best video game of all time. Game Informer ranked it the 21st best video game ever made in 2001. The staff felt that the racing genre had not offered as "complete [a] package" as Gran Turismo. In 2017, Gran Turismo was declared the best driving game ever by Top Gear.

In 1999, Next Generation listed Gran Turismo as number 15 on their "Top 50 Games of All Time", commenting that, "Gran Turismo features cars that handle better than any other racing game ever made". In 2006, Gran Turismo was inducted into GameSpot's list of the greatest games of all time. In 2015, IGN listed Gran Turismo as the second most influential racing game of all time (after Pole Position), calling it "the grandfather of all modern console racing sims."

Notes

References

External links
 

1997 video games
Gran Turismo (series)
Interactive Achievement Award winners
PlayStation (console)-only games
Split-screen multiplayer games
Racing simulators
PlayStation (console) games
Video games developed in Japan
Video games scored by Masahiro Andoh
D.I.C.E. Award for Racing Game of the Year winners